The 5th National Film Awards, formerly the State Awards for Films, were a set of awards presented by the Indian Ministry of Information and Broadcasting to recognize the best Indian films of 1957. The ceremony took place at Vigyan Bhavan, New Delhi, on 16 April 1958. The awards were given by the then-Indian President, Dr. Rajendra Prasad.

It was the first National Film Awards ceremony with monetary prizes in addition to the presentation of medals and certificates.

Awards
Awards were divided into two categories: feature films and non-feature films.

President's Gold Medal for the All India Best Feature Film (now known as the National Film Award for Best Feature)
President's Gold Medal for the Best Documentary Film (now known as the National Film Award for Best Non-Feature Film)
Prime Minister's Gold Medal (now known as the National Film Award for Best Children's Film)
President's Silver Medal for Best Feature Film (now known as the National Film Award for Best Feature Film in a particular language)
Certificate of Merit (discontinued)

Feature films 
Feature films were awarded on a national as well as regional level. Two Hindi films, Do Aankhen Barah Haath and Mother India, in addition to the Bengali film Andhare Alo, won the maximum number of awards.

Do Aankhen Barah Haath also won the President's Gold Medal for the All India Best Feature Film.

All India Awards
The awards for each category follow:

Regional Awards
Regional Awards were given to the best films made in the regional languages of India. However, the President's Silver Medal for Best Feature Film was not given to Assamese, Tamil and Telugu language films; Certificates of Merit were awarded in those languages.

Non-Feature films
Non-feature film awards were given for the documentaries produced in the country.

Awards not given 
Awards not presented (due to a lack of eligible nominees):

 President's Silver Medal for Best Feature Film in Assamese
 President's Silver Medal for Best Feature Film in Tamil
 President's Silver Medal for Best Feature Film in Telugu

References

External links 
 National Film Awards Archives
 Official Page for Directorate of Film Festivals, India

National Film Awards (India) ceremonies
1958 in Indian cinema
1958 film awards